The Big Snooze is a 1946 Warner Bros. Looney Tunes cartoon planned by Bob Clampett and was written by him, but was ultimately completed by Arthur Davis, both being uncredited as directors. Its title was inspired by the 1939 book The Big Sleep, and its 1946 film adaptation, also a Warner release. The Big Snooze features Bugs Bunny and Elmer Fudd, voiced by Mel Blanc and Arthur Q. Bryan.

Plot
Bugs and Elmer are in the midst of their usual hunting-chasing scenario. After Bugs tricks Elmer into running through a hollow log and off a cliff three times (a comic triple of sorts originally used in An earlier Bugs Bunny Cartoon All This and Rabbit Stew; in fact, the same animation sequence was recycled for "The Big Snooze", with the stereotypical black hunter being redrawn into Elmer Fudd). Elmer becomes enraged and frustrated that the writers never let him catch the rabbit in the pictures from which they both appear. He tears up his Warner Bros. cartoon contract and walks off the set to devote his life to fishing, stunning Bugs, who piteously protests and unabashedly, ultimately fruitlessly, begs him to reconsider. During a relaxing fishing trip, Elmer falls asleep.

Bugs observes Elmer's nap, sings a little of "Beautiful Dreamer" and remarks that the dream he notices Elmer is having — that of a classic log and saw, representing snoring — is "a heavenly dream". Then, Bugs decides he had "better look into this", and downs a sleeping pill ("Take deez and doze"). He dreams he is inside Elmer's dream, in a boat crooning "Someone's Rocking My Dreamboat". He decides to use Nightmare Paint to disrupt the "serene scene".

Within Elmer's dreamland, Bugs creates unsettling situations: Elmer appears nearly nude, wearing only his derby hat and a strategically placed "loincloth" consisting of a laurel wreath. Despite the unexpected formula, he covers his body instantly. Next, in a musical parody of "The Campbells Are Coming", and a visual parody of the Pink Elephants on Parade sequence from the Disney film Dumbo (1941), Bugs creates a situation where "Ziwwions and twiwwions of wabbits" are dancing over Elmer while Bugs' voice is heard singing, "The rabbits are coming. Hooray! Hooray!" When Elmer asks where they are all coming from, Bugs replies, "From me, Doc." Then we see him literally multiplying them from an adding machine. Elmer then begins to throw a tantrum.

Looking for another way to torment Elmer, Bugs consults the book A Thousand and One Arabian Nightmares, exclaiming, "Oh, no! It's too gruesome!" before peeking over the book to cheerfully tell the audience, "But I'll do it!" Elmer realizes what Bugs has in mind, pleading, "No, no! No, not that! Not that, please!" as Bugs ties him to railroad tracks, just as "the Super Chief" (Bugs in an Indian chief's war bonnet, leading a conga line of baby rabbits) crosses over Elmer's head.

Elmer's anger about a failed pursuit through the surreal landscape is promptly used against him by Bugs who inquires, "What's the matter doc, ya cold? Here, I'll fix dat." Before Elmer can react, Bugs dresses him in drag, (dress, wig, lipstick) transforming the inept hunter into a woman with an hourglass figure who resembles Rita Hayworth. Bugs inspects his handiwork, then lifts the backdrop to reveal a trio of literal wolves in Zoot suits, lounging by the sign at Hollywood and Vine. When the trio notice "Elmer", one wolf howls, "Hooooow old is she?" while another begins flirting with the gender confused Elmer. Bugs enjoys watching the male wolves hit on Elmer, who exclaims "Gwacious!" before fleeing from the pursuing wolves; he briefly stops to ask the viewer, "Have any of you giwls evew had an expewience wike this?"

Bugs intercepts Elmer and proceeds to engage in the old "run 'this way'!" gag, putting Elmer through a bizarre series of steps which include flipping upside down to run on his hair (which reveals Elmer's panties and how complete the makeover was), hopping on all fours, and dancing a hopak.

As Bugs and Elmer fall off a cliff, Bugs drinks some "Hare Tonic (Stops Falling Hare)" and screeches to a halt in mid-air, while the dream Elmer continues to careen toward earth, finally crash-landing into the real Elmer's snoozing body. He wakes up with a start, exclaiming, "Ooh, what a howwible nightmare!".

Elmer dashes back to the cartoon's original background, pieces his Warner contract back together, and agrees to continue. The chase through the log begins anew. Bugs faces the viewers in a closeup, finishing with the catchphrase from the "Beulah" character on the radio show Fibber McGee and Molly,  "Ah love dat man!"

Reception
Animation historian Jerry Beck writes, "In The Big Snooze, Clampett, who has drawn up imaginary worlds several times before, outdoes himself with the imagery in Elmer's nightmare. The abstract rabbits foreshadow the minimalism of United Productions of America (UPA) cartoons, and the surreal landscape combining clouds, yellow skies, and musical notes is the closest we'll come to visualizing a Looney Tunes acid trip."

Notes
The Big Snooze is available in a restored, uncensored version on the Looney Tunes Golden Collection: Volume 2 DVD set, as part of the compilation What's Up, Doc? A Salute to Bugs Bunny on Volume 3, as a Special Feature on the 2004 Warner Home Video DVD of the 1946 film Night and Day, and on the Boomerang streaming service.

According to historian Milton Gray, who was friends with Clampett during his later years, during his interview with Art Davis, Davis said he didn't understand Clampett's humor and finished what he had and scrapped the rest.

The scene where Bugs paints Elmer's dream with Nightmare Paint was used for a tech demo called Sega Multimedia Studio for the Sega CD, being used to demonstrate the system's capabilities of FMV's as well as other features.

See also
 Looney Tunes and Merrie Melodies filmography
 List of Bugs Bunny cartoons
 List of cartoons featuring Elmer Fudd

References

External links
 
 

1946 films
1946 short films
1946 animated films
1940s LGBT-related films
Looney Tunes shorts
Warner Bros. Cartoons animated short films
Cross-dressing in American films
Films about nightmares
Films directed by Bob Clampett
Films directed by Arthur Davis
Films about hunters
Films scored by Carl Stalling
Bugs Bunny films
Elmer Fudd films
1940s Warner Bros. animated short films
Drag (clothing)-related films